Goumoëns is a municipality in the district of Gros-de-Vaud in the canton of Vaud in Switzerland.

The municipalities of Éclagnens, Goumoens-la-Ville and Goumoens-le-Jux merged on 1 July 2011 into the new municipality of Goumoëns.

History
Éclagnens is first mentioned in 1265 as de Clanens.  Goumoens-la-Ville is first mentioned in 1228 as Guimuens li vila.  Goumoens-le-Jux is first mentioned in 1447 as Gumoens lo Jux.  During the Ancien Régime it was known as Le Craux.

Geography
Of this area,  or 67.7% is used for agricultural purposes, while  or 24.2% is forested.

Historic population

The historical population is given in the following chart:

References

Municipalities of the canton of Vaud